SaliveOne! is the debut extended play by Australian pop-rock group, Uncanny X-Men. It was released in November 1982 and peaked at No. 40 on the Kent Music Report Singles Chart. The EP was recorded live-in-the-studio in one day, two days after signing with Mushroom Records.

Background 

Uncanny X-Men had formed in Melbourne in 1981 and signed with Mushroom Records in 1982. They recorded a six-track extended play, SaliveOne!, live-in-the-studio at AAV Studios on 2 November 1982. Their line-up was Steve Harrison on bass guitar and vocals, Chuck Hargreaves on guitar and vocals, Brian Mannix on lead vocals and keyboards, Nick Matandos on drums and percussion, and Ron Thiessen on lead guitar and vocals. It was produced by Larry Tyler and Tony Buettel.

Track listing

Charts

References 

1982 debut EPs
Uncanny X-Men (band) albums
Mushroom Records albums
EPs by Australian artists